Brian Mascarenhas (born 4 January 1992) is an Indian footballer who plays as a left winger for Real Kashmir in the I-League.

Career

Dempo
After spending one season with Churchill Brothers youth team Brian signed with fellow Goan club Dempo S.C. in the I-League and started for the Reserves initially and scored a stunning goal for Dempo Reserves against Calangute from 40 yards out in the Goa Professional League. He then made his Dempo senior debut against his old club Churchill Brothers on 4 December 2011.

Salgaocar
He left Dempo on 2 June for Salgaocar.

Career statistics

Club

Honour

Goa lusophony 
2014 Lusophony Games: Gold Medal

References

Indian footballers
1992 births
Living people
I-League players
Dempo SC players
Salgaocar FC players
People from South Goa district
Footballers from Goa
Association football wingers
Real Kashmir FC players